George Henry "Kid" Lavigne (December 6, 1869 – March 9, 1928) was boxing's first widely recognized World Lightweight champion, winning the vacant title on June 1, 1896.

Early life 

He was born in Bay City, Michigan to French-Canadian parents, Jean Baptiste Lavigne and Marie Agnes Dufort, who immigrated to the area from St. Polycarpe, Quebec in 1868.  As a youth he worked in his mother's boarding house and later trained as a "cooper" in a sawmill, building barrels to ship salt, a byproduct of many of the mills in the area that sat upon large salt deposits.  The "Kid" got the boxing bug from his brother Billy Lavigne who was tutored in the fistic arts by black heavyweight and local barber, C.A.C. Smith.  Billy would later become the Kid's manager through various parts of his professional career. Lavigne began his amateur boxing career by taking on the best bare-knuckle fighters of the logging camps.  He had his professional debut as a 16-year-old, fighting under the Marquess of Queensberry rules with gloved fists and timed rounds against Morris McNally.  It was a first-round knockout.

Pro career 
Kid Lavigne became a professional boxer in 1886 and was undefeated with 32 wins, 11 draws, 10 no decisions and 1 no contest in his first 54 fights over a span of 12 and 1/2 years.  After defeating the local talent of the area in his first 12 fights he fought journeyman George Siddons in two battles of 77 and 55 rounds in a span of two months.  The first bout went five hours and nine minutes...the longest fight to date under Queensberry rules.  While both were ruled draws Siddons conceded defeat in the second bout and with it Kid Lavigne became lightweight champion of the Northwest.

After fighting several bouts on the West Coast in the early 1890s he landed a bout in 1894 with the lightweight champion of Australia, Albert Griffiths, aka Young Griffo.  Griffo was considered by all to be the most gifted boxer of the era whose ability to avoid getting hit was legendary.  The Kid managed to get a draw in this eight-round contest and a year later another draw over 20 rounds. In December 1894 he fought the lightweight champion of the south, Andy Bowen, a veteran of the longest fight in the history of modern boxing, a 110-round, 7 hour and 19 minute marathon.  It was in the 18th round that Bowen, being beaten badly by Lavigne, was knocked down hitting his head sharply on the unpadded ring surface.  He never regained consciousness and died the next morning at 7:00 am.
At first Lavigne was arrested for the death of Bowen but was later found to be innocent of any wrongdoing as a coroner's inquest ruled that Bowen's death was the result of hitting his head on the floor of the ring.

After Lavigne's disastrous defeat of Bowen he was universally recognized as the American lightweight champion.  He found it more difficult to get matches in his own weight class and was finally matched with Barbados Joe Walcott, the "Barbados Demon". Boxers in both middle and heavy weight classes respected and were  wary of the skills of Walcott, though he fought ten to twenty pounds lighter.  In what has become known as possibly the greatest fight of the early Queensberry era, Lavigne, battered and bloodied with John L. Sullivan at ringside pleading with the referee to halt the carnage, rallied for the win by pummeling Walcott in the latter part of the 15-round bout.

With few left stateside to challenge the indefatigable Lavigne, he sailed for London to fight "Iron Man" Dick Burge, the English champion in June 1896.  He stunned Burge with his relentless pressure and hard hitting, knocking him down repeatedly in the 16th and 17th rounds before the referee called a halt and awarded the fight to Lavigne by technical knockout.  He was now the first undisputed lightweight champion of the world under Marquess of Queensberry rules.  He successfully defended his title six times, including a rematch with Joe Walcott where he punished Walcott through 12 rounds.  Just prior to the beginning of the 13th a sponge sailed into the ring from Walcott's corner signaling the end.  Feeling somewhat invincible the Kid decided to try his skills in a heavier weight class when he challenged his good friend and current welterweight champion, "Mysterious" Billy Smith.  In March 1899 Lavigne fought briskly for 10 rounds getting the best of Smith.  The tide turned and Smith had him out on his feet in the 14th and was sizing-up the knockout blow when the Kid's manager and brother, Billy Lavigne, stepped into the ring and stopped the fight.  In the first loss of Lavigne's career, Smith won on a technical knockout.   Lavigne finally lost the title in a 20-round decision to Frank Erne in July 1899.  Lavigne was beaten again that year by a nineteenth-round knockout from George "Elbows" McFadden.

Retirement 
He fought on sparingly over the next few years, but his addiction to alcohol and his lack of proper training took its toll.  After another knockout at the hands of young Jimmy Britt, Lavigne sailed for France and opened a boxing school in Paris for three years.  He returned to the states and opened a saloon in Detroit, "Kid Lavigne's Triangle Cafe".  He continued to believe he could make a comeback and fought a few exhibitions.  His lost his final match in six rounds against "Fighting" Dick Nelson in 1909.  Finally closing his saloon in late 1913, by 1914 he found himself working for the Highland Park Plant of Ford Motor Company near his home in Detroit.  After his first wife Julia Drujon died in 1922, he remarried two years later to Flora M. Davey.  He had no children.  He worked at Ford until his death of a heart attack at his home at 111 LaBelle Avenue on March 9, 1928, and is buried at Forest Lawn Cemetery in Saginaw.  He was 58 years of age, and like many boxers of his era, had a life somewhat shorter than average.

Honors 
Lavigne was inducted into the Ring Hall of Fame in 1959, the Michigan Boxing Hall of Fame in 1965, the International Boxing Hall of Fame in 1998, the Bay County Sports Hall of Fame in 1998, and the Saginaw County Sports Hall of Fame in 2002.

In other media 
Writer Lauren D. Chouinard, a cousin of Kid Lavigne's, wrote a biography of the Kid titled Muscle and Mayhem: The Saginaw Kid and the Fistic World of the 1890s (2013).

Writer Robert E. Howard wrote a poem eulogizing Kid Lavigne called "Kid Lavigne is Dead".

Professional boxing record
All information in this section is derived from BoxRec, unless otherwise stated.

Official record

All newspaper decisions are officially regarded as “no decision” bouts and are not counted in the win/loss/draw column.

Unofficial record

Record with the inclusion of newspaper decisions in the win/loss/draw column.

See also 

 Lineal championship

References 

|-

External links 
 
 
 Muscle and Mayhem: The Saginaw Kid and the Fistic World of the 1890s 
 International Boxing Hall of Fame Site
 Cyber Boxing Zone Bio

1869 births
1928 deaths
People from Bay City, Michigan
American people of French-Canadian descent
Lightweight boxers
World boxing champions
World lightweight boxing champions
Boxers from Michigan
International Boxing Hall of Fame inductees
American male boxers